Orojabad (also Romanized as Orojābād; also known as Orujābād) is a village in Dadin Rural District, Jereh and Baladeh District, Kazerun County, Fars Province, Iran. At the 2006 census, its population was 44, in 9 families.

References 

Populated places in Kazerun County